Jan Gąsienica Ciaptak (17 December 1922 – 29 October 2009) was a Polish alpine skier. He competed at the 1948, 1952 and the 1956 Winter Olympics.

References

External links
 

1922 births
2009 deaths
Polish male alpine skiers
Polish male ski jumpers
Olympic alpine skiers of Poland
Olympic ski jumpers of Poland
Alpine skiers at the 1948 Winter Olympics
Alpine skiers at the 1952 Winter Olympics
Alpine skiers at the 1956 Winter Olympics
Ski jumpers at the 1948 Winter Olympics
Sportspeople from Zakopane
20th-century Polish people